, also known as Via Carolina (between Nuremberg and the Czech border continuing to Prague - by czech motorway D5) is a 477 km (296.4 mi) long German autobahn. It starts at the French border near Saarbrücken in the west and ends at the Czech border near Waidhaus in the east.

The first plans for the A 6 were laid out in 1935; construction on several parts began in 1938. In 1940, construction near Mannheim was stopped when the bridge across the Rhine collapsed, killing many workers. A new bridge, the Theodor Heuss Bridge (Frankenthal), was opened in 1953. Other parts of the A 6 were completed in 1941. A part near Kaiserslautern was used as an airstrip by the Luftwaffe during World War II. After the war, it was taken over by US forces and became the Ramstein Air Base, while the A 6 was re-built south of the air base.

In the 1960s, construction was continued. One new section cut through the Hockenheimring, requiring a major redesign of the race track which resulted in the construction of the Motodrom stadium.

Much like its southern counterpart, the A 8, the A 6 is relatively old and has received little upgrading, making it difficult for it to handle today's traffic. The section around Mannheim is currently being widened and modernised from a four-lane to a six-lane motorway requiring the construction of a new bridge over the River Neckar.

The Autobahn 6 crosses the Kocher valley between Heilbronn and Nuremberg via the Kocher viaduct (German: Kochertalbrücke) near Schwäbisch Hall.

The direct motorway connection between Prague and Paris was completed when the last missing section between junction Amberg-Ost and interchange Oberpfälzer Wald was inaugurated on 10 September 2008.

References

External links 

6
A006
A006
A006
A006
A006
Buildings and structures in Nürnberger Land